Gabor Szabo Live (also referred to as Live with Charles Lloyd featuring Spellbinder) is an album by Hungarian guitarist Gábor Szabó featuring performances recorded at The Troubadour in early 1972 and released on the Blue Thumb label in 1974.

Reception

The Allmusic review states "Features Szabo where he shone brightest -- live. Good performances of reliable staples".

Track listing
 "Spellbinder" (Gábor Szabó) - 7:07
 "Sombrero Sam" (Charles Lloyd) - 10:48
 "Stormy" (Buddy Buie, James Cobb) - 8:55
 "People" (Jule Styne, Bob Merrill) - 9:41 
Recorded at The Troubadour in West Hollywood, California in early 1972

Personnel
Gábor Szabó - guitar
Charles Lloyd - flute (track 2)
Tony Ortega - flute, echoplex (track 3)
Tommy Eyre - keyboards (track 4)
Wolfgang Melz - bass
John Dentz - drums
Mailto Correa - conga, percussion

References

Blue Thumb Records live albums
Gábor Szabó albums
1974 live albums
Albums produced by Tommy LiPuma
Albums recorded at the Troubadour